Micco is a census-designated place (CDP) in Brevard County, Florida. The population was 9,052 at the 2010 United States Census. It is part of the Palm Bay–Melbourne–Titusville Metropolitan Statistical Area.

History
Frank Smith was the first settler in 1877. In 1880, a post office was established under the name Chipco, however it was discontinued after only a year. It was re-established under the name Micco in 1884. In 1993, the post office was merged with the Sebastian post office. They are in two separate buildings next to one another, but one is merely a counterpart of the other.

Geography
Micco is mapped at  (27.877504, −80.514578).

Micco shares its zip code with Sebastian.

Surrounding areas
 Grant-Valkaria 
 Deer Run 
 Indian River Lagoon 
 Indian River County

Demographics

As of the census of 2000, there were 9,498 people, 5,212 households, and 3,163 families residing in the CDP. The racial makeup of the CDP was 98.82% White, 0.24% African American, 0.15% Native American, 0.09% Asian, 0.13% Pacific Islander, 0.18% from other races, and 0.39% from two or more races. Hispanic or Latino of any race were 1.32% of the population.

There were 5,212 households, out of which 5.2% had children under the age of 18 living with them, 54.6% were married couples living together, 4.2% had a female householder with no husband present, and 39.3% were non-families. 34.4% of all households were made up of individuals, and 26.1% had someone living alone who was 65 years of age or older. The average household size was 1.82 and the average family size was 2.23.

In the CDP, the population was spread out, with 5.9% under the age of 18, 2.0% from 18 to 24, 9.3% from 25 to 44, 24.2% from 45 to 64, and 58.6% who were 65 years of age or older. The median age was 69 years. For every 100 females, there were 87.4 males. For every 100 females age 18 and over, there were 86.7 males.

The median income for a household in the CDP was $27,673, and the median income for a family was $34,645. Males had a median income of $25,638 versus $20,352 for females. The per capita income for the CDP was $20,649. About 5.1% of families and 10.1% of the population were below the poverty line, including 37.3% of those under age 18 and 6.1% of those age 65 or over.

References

Census-designated places in Brevard County, Florida
Census-designated places in Florida
Populated places on the Intracoastal Waterway in Florida